Nation of Two is the second studio album by Australian singer-songwriter Vance Joy. The album was announced on 12 January 2018. The album serves as a follow-up to his 2014 album Dream Your Life Away (2014). with Vance Joy explaining: "Nation of Two describes a perfectly self-contained couple; their world beginning and ending at the bed they share, the car they ride in, or any other place where they're together... the idea that their love for each other gives them their bearings; a point of reference that makes sense of life." The concept originally appeared in the Kurt Vonnegut novel Mother Night.

At the ARIA Music Awards of 2018, Nation of Two won Best Adult Contemporary Album.

Singles
"Lay It on Me" was released as the lead single from the album on 12 July 2017. The song peaked at number 18 on the Australian Singles Chart and has been certified platinum. "Like Gold" was released on 3 November 2017 as the album's second single. "We're Going Home" was released on 12 January 2018 as the album's third single. "Saturday Sun" was released as the fourth single on 1 February 2018. "Call If You Need Me" was released on 11 February 2018 and "I'm With You" was released as the sixth single on 21 September 2018.

A week before the album's release, Vance Joy posted a 13-second preview of "I'm With You" on his Twitter account, stating that it was one of his favorite tracks on the album. On 19 February, he revealed a 15-second preview of "Little Boy" stating that the song was about when he fell off his bike as a young boy (among other things).

Critical reception

Nation of Two received mixed reviews. Will Rosebury from Clash said Joy "...creates a leaner and more cohesive project that thematically focuses on the highs and lows of a romantic relationship. Although occasionally over-sentimental and by its very nature derivative, it is impossible to deny that Joy can write a touching tune." Jenna Mohammed from Exclaim! said Joy "rarely strays from the upbeat, harmonious vocals that made Vance Joy successful in 2014 on Dream Your Life Away", adding the songs are "catchy and fun, but lack originality". Michael Hann from The Guardian said "There's a breezy, easy attractiveness to his melodies, albeit that they never fail to do exactly what you might expect." Glenn Gamboa from Newsday said Joy "has gone deeper and broader, making singalongs that sound even bigger" and concluded "Joy may have lost the power of surprise, but he has replaced it with stronger songs that will stick with fans as long as 'Riptide'."

Commercial performance
Nation of Two debuted at number one on the ARIA Albums Chart, making it Joy's second Australian number-one album. It also debuted at number 10 on the US Billboard 200 with over 28,000 equivalent sales.

Track listing

Charts

Weekly charts

Year-end charts

Certifications

Release history

References

2018 albums
Vance Joy albums
ARIA Award-winning albums
Liberation Records albums